HarryBigButton is a hard rock trio formed in 2011 in Seoul, Korea by a former guitarist of Korean thrash metal band Crash Lee Sung Soo. The band's current lineup are Lee Sung Soo (vocals, guitar), Woo Suk Jae (bass) and Choi Bo Kyung (drums).The debut EP album titled Hard ‘N’ Loud was released in 2011. In 2012, they began to receive public attention after appearing in a national TV-station KBS “Top Band”. The band participated in the official program of the 30th anniversary diplomatic relations between Korea and Russia. Their album King's Life charted on Gaon at No. 77.

Band members 

Current members
 Lee Sung Soo − guitars, vocals (2011−present)
 Woo Suk Jae − bass (2022−present)
 Choi Bo Kyung − drums (2011-2012, 2022–present)

Discography

Albums and EPs 
 Hard'N'Loud (2011)
 King's Life (2012)
 Perfect Storm (2014)
 Man Of Spirit (2017)
 Dirty Harry (2020)

Singles 
 Control (2013)
 Social Network (2015)
 Man Of Spirit (2015)
 Snowball Project Vol.1 (2016)
 Wild East Blues (2019)
 Kukushka (Viktor Tsoi) (2019)
 Dawn Of The Dead (Collab version) (2020)
 Thelma & Louise (2022)

Performance history 
 Jisan Valley Rock Festival (2012), Radiohead, The Stone Roses etc.
 Supersonic (2013), Pet Shop Boys, John Legend etc,
 Pentaport Rock Festival  (2014), Travis, Kasabian etc,
 Jisan Valley Rock Festival (2015), Motorhead, Foo Fighters etc,
 Jisan Valley Rock Festival (2017), Major Lazer, Gorillaz etc,
 2019 Rock in Russia concert
 Pentaport Rock Festiva (2019)
 MU:CON (2020) byKOCAA

Chart

References

External links 
 

Musical groups established in 2011
South Korean indie rock groups
2011 establishments in South Korea